The 1928 Tulsa Golden Hurricane football team represented the University of Tulsa during the 1928 college football season. In their fourth year under head coach Gus Henderson, the Golden Hurricane compiled a 7–2–1 record and outscored their opponents by a total of 267 cto 80.

Schedule

References

Tulsa
Tulsa Golden Hurricane football seasons
Tulsa Golden Hurricane football